Halicin (SU-3327) is a chemical compound that acts as an inhibitor of the enzyme c-Jun N-terminal kinase (JNK). Originally, it was researched for the treatment of diabetes, but development was discontinued for this application due to poor results in testing.

Naming
Researchers named the molecule after the fictional artificial intelligence system from 2001: A Space Odyssey because of how AI predictive computer models were used to identify the probability it would work as an antibiotic.

Antibiotic ability
Halicin was identified by artificial intelligence researchers at the MIT Jameel Clinic in 2019 using an in silico deep learning approach, as a likely broad-spectrum antibiotic. This likelihood was verified by in vitro cell culture testing, followed by in vivo tests in mice. It showed activity against drug-resistant strains of Clostridiodes difficile, Acinetobacter baumannii, and Mycobacterium tuberculosis, with an unusual mechanism of action involving the sequestration of iron inside the bacterial cells, that thereby interferes with their ability to regulate the pH balance across the cell membrane properly. Since this is a different mode of action from most antibiotics, halicin retained activity against bacterial strains resistant to many commonly used drugs.

Preliminary studies suggest that halicin kills bacteria by disrupting their ability to maintain an electrochemical gradient across their cell membranes. This gradient is necessary, among other functions, to produce ATP (molecules that cells use to store and transfer energy), so if the gradient breaks down, the cells die. This type of killing mechanism could be difficult for bacteria to develop resistance to.

References

External links 
 Machine Learning for Antibiotics

Enzyme inhibitors
Antibiotics